Saathi is a 2022 Indian Bengali Language Drama television series which is premiered on 7 February 2022 on Bengali general entertainment channel Sun Bangla. The show is produced by Firdausul Hasan and Probal Haldar of Friends Communication and stars Anumita Dutta and Indrajeet Bose. It is an Remake of the Tamil Television series Roja.

Plot

Cast

Main 

 Anumita Dutta as Sumedha Banerjee aka Brishti: Om's wife, Ananda's foster daughter.
 Indrajeet Bose as Om Sanyal: Brishti's husband, Alokesh's son.

Recurring 

 Debdut Ghosh as Ananda Thakur: owner of Ananda orphanage, Brishti's foster father.
 Tania Kar as Brishti's mother.
 Goutam Sarkar as Alokesh Sanyal: Om's father.
 Piyali Mitra as Om's mother
 Rumki Chatterjee as Om's grandmother.
 Megha Mondal as Om's sister.
 Shirin Roy / Sreyasri Roy as Priyanka
 Rupsa Chatterjee / Rupa Bhattacharjee as Satobhisa Sen

Adaptations

References

External links 

 Saathi at Sun NXT

Bengali-language television programming in India
Sun Bangla original programming
2022 Indian television series debuts
Bengali-language television series based on Tamil-language television series